"Bazinga!" is the catchphrase used by Sheldon Cooper of The Big Bang Theory.

Bazinga may also refer to:

 Bazinga rieki, a jellyfish genus
 Euglossa bazinga, a species of orchid bee
 "Bazinga" (song), a 2021 song by SB19

See also
 
 Behzinga, English YouTuber
 BaZnGa, a ternary compound of barium, zinc, and gallium